Novum Canal is a Portuguese television channel broadcasting from the Porto metropolitan area, out of Paredes, primarily serving Northern Portugal.

History
Novum Canal was launched in 2019, to serve the audience of Northern Portugal.

In July 2019, Novum Canal was the victim of a cyber attack that stole hours of content from the program Datavénia, a show that breaks down legal matters for a non-legal audience.

Programming
In terms of content the channel airs regionally-oriented programming,alongside generalist content and opinion journalism.

Regional focus is on Northern Portugal and, in particular, the Porto metropolitan area, and the nearby municipalities of Paços de Ferreira, Penafiel, Marco de Canaveses, Lousada, Castelo de Paiva, and Felgueiras.

Major programming

 Jornal Diário
 Mundo em Português
 Hoje á Norte
 Democracia em Debate
 Datavénia
 Cortar a Direito
 Virar à Esquerda

 Raiz da Questão
 Especial Informação
 Informação Semenal
 É Psicológico
 Fiel à Mesa
 Pandemónio
 La Vie en Rose Gold

References

External links
Official site
Novum Canal on Facebook
Novum Canal on Twitter
Novum Canal on YouTube

Mass media in Portugal
Mass media in Porto
Television networks in Portugal
Television stations in Portugal
2001 establishments in Portugal
Portuguese-language television stations
Television channels and stations established in 2001